The Willacy County Regional Detention Center aka the Willacy Detention Center is a privately owned prison for men located in Raymondville, Willacy County, Texas, operated by Management and Training Corporation (MTC) under contract with the U.S. Marshal Service.

The prison was originally built in 2003 and has an official capacity of 586 federal detainees.

There have been numerous reports of sexual assault and physical assault on detainees held at Willacy. In 2009, over 900 grievances were filed by detainees.

The federal contract with MTC will end in September 2021. The country is considering operating the facility by itself, which would still be permitted under federal restrictions.

This facility is adjacent to two other private prison sites:  the Willacy County Correctional Center, formerly operated by the Management and Training Corporation for the federal government and closed in 2015, and the Willacy County State Jail, operated by the Corrections Corporation of America through August 2017, under contract with the state of Texas, and subsequently by the LaSalle Corrections corporation.

References

Prisons in Texas
Private prisons in the United States
Buildings and structures in Willacy County, Texas
Management and Training Corporation
2003 establishments in Texas